Easily Slip Into Another World is an album by saxophonist/composer Henry Threadgill, recorded for the RCA Novus label in 1987.

Recording and music
The album was recorded at Mediasound Studio, New York City, on September 20, 1987.

The album features five of Threadgill's compositions (six on CD) and one by Olu Dara. The musicians are Threadgill with Frank Lacy, Rasul Siddik, Fred Hopkins, Diedre Murray, Pheeroan akLaff and Reggie Nicholson, with guest vocalist Asha Puthli (credited as Aisha Putli) added on "My Rock".

Reception

The AllMusic review by Stephen Cook awarded the album 4 stars, stating, "Easily Slip Into Another World and Threadgill's other Novus titles (You Know the Number and Rag, Bush and All) offer a fine introduction to the work of one of jazz's best and most underrated composers and improvisers".

Track listing
All compositions by Henry Threadgill except as indicated
 "I Can't Wait Till I Get Home" (Olu Dara) - 4:04 
 "Black Hands Bejewelled" - 7:03 
 "Spotted Dick is Pudding" - 8:51 
 "Let Me Look Down Your Throat or Say Ah" - 7:11 Bonus track on CD
 "My Rock" - 8:09 
 "Hall" - 4:02 
 "Award the Squadtett" - 6:59

Personnel
Henry Threadgill - alto saxophone, tenor saxophone, bass flute
Rasul Siddik - trumpet
Frank Lacy - trombone
Diedre Murray - cello
Fred Hopkins - bass
Reggie Nicholson - percussion
Pheeroan akLaff - percussion
Asha Puthli (credited as Aisha Putli) - vocals (track 5)

References

1987 albums
Henry Threadgill albums
Novus Records albums